Alexander Wilson (5 June 1917 – 23 March 1978) was a British Labour Party politician.

Wilson was educated at the Forth Grammar School, before becoming a coal miner.  He joined the Labour Party, and served on the Third District Council of Lanarkshire for eleven years.

Wilson's first parliamentary contest was the Hamilton by-election of 1967, in which he lost to the Scottish National Party candidate Winifred Ewing. However, Wilson was able to gain the seat from her at the 1970 general election.

Wilson held the seat until his death at the age of 60 in 1978.  George Robertson, the future NATO Secretary-General, was elected as his successor in the subsequent by-election.

References

Times Guide to the House of Commons October 1974

External links 
 

1917 births
1978 deaths
Scottish Labour MPs
Members of the Parliament of the United Kingdom for Scottish constituencies
National Union of Mineworkers-sponsored MPs
UK MPs 1970–1974
UK MPs 1974
UK MPs 1974–1979